Ayşe Athermelik Dürrüşehvar Hanım ("womanly", "radiant angel" and "shining heroine";  1767  11 May 1831) was the eldest daughter of Sultan Abdul Hamid I of the Ottoman Empire.

Early life
Dürrüşehvar Hanım was born in 1767 in Istanbul. She was the daughter of   Abdul Hamid I, when he was still a prince. Since it was forbidden for the princes to have children before their accession to the throne. It means that she was to be killed. However, Abdul Hamid managed to take her out of Istanbul and hide her in safe place until he ascended the throne.

Marriage
When her father ascended the throne in 1774, she was taken back to Istanbul. Where Abdul Hamid told everyone that she is his daughter. She however wasn't given the title of sultana, and thus she was considered as the adopted daughter of the sultan. 

In 1784, when Dürrüşehvar was seventeen, her father married her to Nişancı Ahmed Nazif Efendi, the son of Hacı Selim Ağa. The marriage was held in Istanbul. The couple had two daughters,  Atiyetullah Hanım (b. 1785) and Zeynep Hanım (b. 1789).

Ayşe Dürrüşehvar lived a comfortable and delightful life until her father's death. In 1789, her husband and father in law were  executed by Selim III when he became the Sultan due to some serous allegations, and she was widowed by his death. Like the princess of her generation she didn't remarry.

Dürrüşehvar was responsible for transporting Nakşidil Sultan to Topkapı Palace as she became the new Valide Sultan.

Death
Ayşe Athermelik Dürrüşehvar Hanım died on 11 May 1831 at the age of sixty four in her palace in Kuruçeşme and was buried the mausoleum of  Nakşidil Sultan Mausoleum, Fatih, Istanbul.

Annotations

References

Sources

1767 births
1826 deaths
Royalty from Istanbul
18th-century Ottoman princesses
19th-century Ottoman princesses